Matt McCooey (born 27 May 1981) is an English–Japanese actor best known for his role as DC Bill Wong in the television programme Agatha Raisin.

Early life
McCooey is the son of author and journalist Chris McCooey and Kumiko Aoki. He was born in Nagoya, Japan, where his father was a lecturer and subsequently Associate Professor at Nagoya University of Commerce. He studied acting in Aberystwyth University and later trained at the Drama Studio, London, which he graduated in 2004.

Career
McCooey has appeared in four Shakespeare productions - Romeo and Juliet (Changeling Company, 2004), Twelfth Night (Changeling Company, 2005), King Lear (Yellow Earth, 2006) and A Midsummer Night's Dream (Southwark Playhouse, 2009).

McCooey made his screen debut in the programme EastEnders.

In 2014, McCooey went on to play the role of DC Bill Wong in the British television programme Agatha Raisin. His other credits include Doctors, Skins and Invizimals.

In 2020, he joined the voice cast as Kenji in the UK & US versions of Thomas & Friends, respectively.

Personal life
McCooey has a British Japanese dual citizenship.

Filmography

Film

Television

Video games

References

External links

1981 births
English male film actors
English male television actors
English male video game actors
English male voice actors
English people of Japanese descent
21st-century English male actors
Male actors of Japanese descent
People from Nagoya
Alumni of Aberystwyth University
Living people
British male actors of Japanese descent